San Pablo Catholic University, known locally as Universidad Católica San Pablo (UCSP) is a private university in Arequipa, Peru. The university is owned by the Sodalitium Christianae Vitae.

The university has two campuses, one in Salaverry avenue, and one in Campiña Paisajista urb.

See also
 Official website
 List of universities in Peru

Educational institutions established in 1996
Catholic universities and colleges in Peru
1996 establishments in Peru